Eliza Constantia Campbell (née Pryce; 8 January 1796 – 1864) was a Welsh author.

Campbell was the daughter of Richard Pryce, Esq., of Gunley, Montgomeryshire. She was married twice: first, in 1827, to Commander Robert Campbell, R.N., of Edinburgh.  Their son was the classical scholar Lewis Campbell.  Pryce died in 1832. 

In 1833, Campbell published a collection of her stories titled Stories from the History of Wales, under the pseudonym "A Lady of the Principality";   It was reissued in 1837 as Tales about Wales.

Campbell married Capt. Hugh Morrieson, E.I.C. He died in 1859. 

Campbell died in 1864. The National Gallery of Scotland holds a significant number of her prints.

References 

1796 births
1864 deaths
18th-century Welsh people
18th-century Welsh women
19th-century Welsh writers
19th-century Welsh women writers